European Technical Assistance Cooperation (EUTAC ) is a project of German Johanniter-Unfall-Hilfe e.V. (Johanniter International Assistance) and Cyprus Civil Defence developing a Technical Assistance and Support Team for an assistance of EU civil protection interventions.

The EUTAC project was co-funded by the European Commission, Civil Protection Mechanism, Preparatory Action 2008.

Missions 

 Haiti (November/December 2010)

Field Exercises 

 FEX - Austria/Slovenia (May 2010)
 EU ModEX - Germany (March 2011)
 EU ModEX - Netherlands (May 2011)
 Johanniter Fieldcamp - Germany (October 2011) (in German Language)
 Peregrine Sword - Germany (September 2012)
 EU Cold Conditions Exercise / EUCC-II - Finland (April 2013) 
 EU ModEX - Estonia (May 2013 - in cooperation with CMC Finland) 
 EU CoordEX 2014 - Finland (April 2014)
 EU ModEX 2014 - Denmark (June 2014 - in cooperation with CMC Finland)

References

External links
Official site

Disaster preparedness
Disaster preparedness in Europe